The Sorcerer's Apprentice is a 1980 Canadian animated film by Peter Sander, produced by Sandermation. It was based on a story by The Brothers Grimm.

References

External links
 Watch The Sorcerer's Apprentice 
 

1980 films
Canadian animated short films
1980 animated films
English-language Canadian films
1980s English-language films
1980s Canadian films